Birinci Şordəhnə (also, Shordakhna Pervoye, Shordekhna Pervoye, and Shordekhne) is a village in the Agdash Rayon of Azerbaijan.

References 

Populated places in Agdash District